In operator theory, a Toeplitz operator is the compression of a multiplication operator on the circle to the Hardy space.

Details

Let S1 be the circle, with the standard Lebesgue measure, and L2(S1) be the Hilbert space of square-integrable functions. A bounded measurable function g on S1 defines a multiplication operator Mg on L2(S1). Let P be the projection from L2(S1) onto the Hardy space H2. The Toeplitz operator with symbol g is defined by

where " | " means restriction.

A bounded operator on H2 is Toeplitz if and only if its matrix representation, in the basis {zn, n ≥ 0}, has constant diagonals.

Theorems

 Theorem: If  is continuous, then  is Fredholm if and only if  is not in the set .

For a proof, see . He attributes the theorem to Mark Krein, Harold Widom, and Allen Devinatz. This can be thought of as an important special case of the Atiyah-Singer index theorem.

 Axler-Chang-Sarason Theorem: The operator  is compact if and only if .

See .

See also

References

 
 .
 .
 .
 . Reprinted by Dover Publications, 1997, .

Operator theory
Hardy spaces
Linear operators